Barez may refer to:
 Jebal Barez, a mountain range of Kerman Province, Iran
 Barez Rural District, an administrative division of Chaharmahal and Bakhtiari Province, Iran